The 2019–20 King Cup, or The Custodian of the Two Holy Mosques Cup, was the 45th edition of the King Cup since its establishment in 1957, and the 2nd under the current format. It commenced on 3 November 2019 and concluded with the final on 28 November 2020. Originally, the final was to have been played by May 2020, but the competition was delayed due to the effects of the COVID-19 pandemic in Saudi Arabia.

Al-Taawoun were the defending champions, but they were eliminated by Abha in the Round of 16.

Al-Hilal won their ninth title after a 2–1 win over Al-Nassr in the final on 28 November 2020. As Al-Hilal had already qualified for the 2021 AFC Champions League, Al-Wehda entered the 2021 AFC Champions League in the qualifying play-offs round.

Participating teams
A total of 64 teams participated in this season. 16 teams from the Pro league, 20 teams from the MS League, 24 teams from the Second Division and 4 teams qualifying from the preliminary stage.

Bracket

Note:     H: Home team, A: Away team

Source: SAFF

Round of 64
The draw for the Round of 64 was held on 7 October 2019. The Round of 64 matches were played between 3 and 13 November 2019. All times are local, AST (UTC+3).

Round of 32
The draw for the Round of 32, as well as the draw for the rest of tournament, was held on 26 November 2019. The Round of 32 matches will be played from 3 to 7 December 2019. All times are local, AST (UTC+3).

Round of 16
The dates for the Round of 16 fixtures were announced on 8 December 2019. Two matches were played on 23 and 24 December 2019, due to Al-Nassr and Al-Taawoun's participation in the 2019 Saudi Super Cup. The rest of the matches were played from 1 to 4 January 2020. All times are local, AST (UTC+3).

Quarter-finals
The dates for the Quarter-finals fixtures were announced on 6 January 2020. The matches were played from 16 to 18 January 2020. All times are local, AST (UTC+3).

Semi-finals
The dates for the Semi-finals fixtures were announced on 21 January 2020. The matches were scheduled to be played on 15 March 2020. On 14 March 2020, the Saudi Ministry of Sports announced that the semi-finals would be postponed due to the COVID-19 pandemic. The fixtures were revised to the 27 October 2020 following the end of the suspension. All ties were played behind closed doors. All times are local, AST (UTC+3).

Final

The final was played on 28 November 2020 at the King Fahd International Stadium in Riyadh. All times are local, AST (UTC+3).

Top goalscorers
As of 28 November 2020

Note: Players and teams marked in bold are still active in the competition.

References

External links
Custodian of the Two Holy Mosques Cup – Saudi Arabia 2020, Goalzz.com
King's Cup, saff.com.sa

2019–20
2019–20 in Saudi Arabian football
Saudi Arabia
Saudi Arabia